The 1946 Rhode Island Rams football team was an American football team that represented Rhode Island State College (later renamed the University of Rhode Island) as a member of the Yankee Conference during the 1946 college football season. In its second season under head coach Bill Beck, the team compiled a 2–4 record (1–2 against conference opponents) and finished in third place in the conference. The team played its home games at Meade Stadium in Kingston, Rhode Island.

Schedule

References

Rhode Island State
Rhode Island Rams football seasons
Rhode Island State Rams football